Transportes Aeromar, S.A. de C.V, doing business as Aeromar, was a Mexican airline that operated scheduled domestic services in Mexico and international services to the United States, and Cuba. Its main base was Mexico City International Airport.

The airline ceased all operations on February 15, 2023 following a financial collapse.

History

Foundation and development
The airline was established on January 29, 1987 and started operations on November 7, 1987 as Transportes Aeromar.

It was owned by Grupo Aeromar (private company) (99.99%) and had 864 employees in July 2010. On April 1, 2010, Aeromar signed a commercial alliance with Continental Airlines. Aeromar then announced it would lease two Bombardier CRJ200 regional jets. These twin jet aircraft were subsequently removed from the airline's fleet.

On August 30, 2010, Aeromar and Continental Airlines announced a frequent flyer partnership that allowed each carrier's passengers to earn and redeem miles on either airline. In addition, Continental international first- and business class passengers, Presidents Club members and Star Alliance Gold customers were able to access Aeromar's Salon Aeromar lounge in Mexico City at that time. When Continental Airlines merged into United Airlines, the codeshare agreement was transferred over to United.

As of 2018, Avianca has expressed interest in acquiring or merging with Aeromar to become "Avianca Mexico". The airline is awaiting a 100 million USD injection from Avianca's parent company, Synergy Group. Avianca would've had to first acquire up to 49% of the airline over the next five months. The deal did not go through.

Demise
As of 2023, it was reported that the airline was $600 million USD in debt, primarily due to efforts to avoid a Mexican government financial collapse, and faced the posibility of cessation of operations after February 14, 2023. Operations have declined since 2020, impacted by the COVID-19 pandemic. At the same time, reports also emerged that Brazilian start-up carrier Nella Linhas Aéreas has acquired Aeromar, according to logo updates on its official website and social platforms. The deal is reported to be pending, but would not proceed if debts were not canceled by the Mexican Federal Government.

Aeromar announced on February 15, 2023 the definitive cessation of its operations, due to financial problems, after 35 years of flying uninterruptedly in Mexico, the United States and Cuba. Aeromar owes over MX$5 billion pesos (US$268 million) to different creditors, including the Mexican authorities. Several laid off employees are being offered jobs for Aeroméxico and Volaris.

Destinations

Codeshare agreements
On February 1, 2011, Aeromar and Continental Airlines implemented codesharing on all routes at Aeromar's hub in Mexico City International Airport. Aeromar then started operating additional domestic services such as flights to Durango, Matamoros, Ixtapa, and Piedras Negras; and announced it would re-evaluate its international services. Currently, the only international destination served by the airline is McAllen, Texas although Aeromar previously served Austin, Texas and San Antonio, Texas. When Continental Airlines merged into United Airlines, the codeshare agreement was transferred over to United.

On August 1, 2019, Aeromar and Turkish Airlines signed a codeshare agreement, after the latter carrier commenced operations to Mexico City. On August 3, 2021, Aeromar and Emirates signed an interline partnership that will provide customers with connectivity between destinations in Mexico and the United States through Mexico City with the Emirates global network. On March 29, 2022, Aeromar and Air Canada signed an interline agreement to boost connectivity between Mexico and Canada. The agreement was planned to grow by the summer season.

Fleet

Over the years, the Aeromar fleet consisted the following aircraft:

Fleet development
In early 2015, Aeromar decided to remove its Bombardier CRJ200 regional jet aircraft from operations. The airline then supplemented its fleet of fifteen ATR 42 turboprops with two new larger ATR 72-600 aircraft. In November 2016, the airline ordered eight new ATR 42 and ATR 72 aircraft and optioned another six ATR 72s. Aeromar's first ATR 42-600 was handed over by the airframer in December 2016.

Services

Frequent Flyer Programs
Aeromar participated in the United Airlines MileagePlus program and the Air Canada Aeroplan program, despite not being owned by United Airlines Holdings or Air Canada, nor being a member of Star Alliance, of which those airlines are currently a member.

Airport lounges
Salon Aeromar was Aeromar's private airport lounge.

References

External links

 
official website 
"Aeromar Making Waves." Flight International. 6–12 March 1996. Page 31.

Defunct airlines of Mexico
Airlines established in 1987
Airlines disestablished in 2023
Airlines of Mexico City
Mexican companies established in 1987
2023 disestablishments in Mexico
Regional airlines of Mexico